The 2015 Pacific hurricane season was the second-most active Pacific hurricane season on record, and featured the strongest tropical cyclone ever observed in the Western Hemisphere: Hurricane Patricia. The season officially started on May 15 in the Eastern Pacific—east of 140°W—and on June 1 in the Central Pacific—between the International Date Line and 140°W—and ended on November 30. 

These dates typically cover the period of each year when most tropical cyclones form in the Northeastern Pacific tropical cyclone basin. The season's first storm, Hurricane Andres, developed on May 28; the season's final storm, Tropical Depression Nine-C, dissipated on December 31, well after the official end of the season.

Throughout the season, 31 tropical depressions developed, 26 of which became tropical storms, a record-tying 16 of them reached hurricane strength, and a record-breaking 11 achieved major hurricane intensity. Activity in the Central Pacific shattered records, with 16 tropical cyclones forming in or entering the basin; the previous highest was 11 during the 1992 and 1994 seasons. 

On August 30, three hurricanes at Category 4 strength—Ignacio, Jimena, and Kilo—existed simultaneously in the Northeastern Pacific, which was a first for the basin. 

Activity in the basin was boosted by the strong 2014–16 El Niño event, which brought anomalously high sea surface temperatures and low vertical wind shear that helped the numerous systems form and intensify.

Four time zones are utilized in the basin: Central for storms east of 106.0°W, Mountain from 106.0°W to 114.9°W, Pacific from 115.0°W to 140.0°W, and Hawaii–Aleutian for storms between the International Date Line and 140°W. However, for convenience, all information is listed by Coordinated Universal Time (UTC) first with the respective local time included in parentheses. This timeline includes information that was not operationally released, meaning that data from post-storm reviews by the National Hurricane Center and Central Pacific Hurricane Center are included. This timeline documents tropical cyclone formations, strengthening, weakening, landfalls, extratropical transitions, and dissipations during the season.

Timeline

May
May 15
The 2015 Pacific hurricane season officially begins.

May 28
06:00 UTC (12:00 a.m. MDT) at  – Tropical Depression One-E develops from an area of disturbed weather about 830 mi (1,335 km) south of the southern tip of the Baja California Peninsula.
12:00 UTC (6:00 a.m. MDT) at  – Tropical Depression One-E intensifies into a tropical storm and is named Andres while located 815 mi (1,310 km) south of the southern tip of the Baja California Peninsula.

May 29
18:00 UTC (12:00 p.m.

May 30
12:00 UTC (5:00 a.m.

May 31
00:00 UTC (5:00 p.m. This marks only the fifth such storm since 1971 to develop during May.
12:00 UTC (7:00 a.m.

June
June 1

00:00 UTC (5:00 p.m.
06:00 UTC (11:00 p.m.
12:00 UTC (7:00 a.m.

June 2
00:00 UTC (5:00 p.m. PDT, June 1) at  – Hurricane Andres weakens to a Category 3 hurricane roughly 695 mi (1,120 km) west-southwest of Socorro Island.
06:00 UTC (11:00 p.m. PDT, June 1) at  – Hurricane Andres weakens to a Category 2 hurricane approximately 730 mi (1,175 km) west-southwest of Socorro Island.
12:00 UTC (5:00 a.m. PDT) at  – Hurricane Andres weakens to a Category 1 hurricane about 775 mi (1,245 km) west of Socorro Island.
18:00 UTC (1:00 p.m.

June 3

06:00 UTC (11:00 p.m. PDT, June 2) at  – Hurricane Andres weakens to a tropical storm about 895 mi (1,440 km) west of Socorro Island.
06:00 UTC (1:00 a.m.
12:00 UTC (7:00 a.m. This marks the earliest occurrence of a season's second major hurricane since reliable records began in 1971.
18:00 UTC (1:00 p.m.

June 4
06:00 UTC (1:00 a.m.
12:00 UTC (5:00 a.m. PDT) at  – Tropical Storm Andres degenerates to a remnant low roughly 905 mi (1,455 km) west-northwest of Socorro Island.
12:00 UTC (7:00 a.m.

June 5
12:00 UTC (6:00 p.m.

June 6
00:00 UTC (6:00 p.m.
06:00 UTC (12:00 a.m.
12:00 UTC (6:00 a.m.
18:00 UTC (12:00 p.m.

June 7
Around 03:30 UTC (9:30 p.m.
06:00 UTC (12:00 a.m.
18:00 UTC (12:00 p.m.

June 8

10:00 UTC (4:00 a.m. This marks the earliest instance of a tropical cyclone making landfall along the Baja California Peninsula since reliable records began in 1971, and occurred a month earlier than the previous record.
11:15 UTC (5:15 a.m.
20:00 UTC (2:00 p.m. MDT) at  – Tropical Storm Blanca briefly emerges back over the Pacific Ocean, weakening to a tropical depression in the process.

June 9
06:00 UTC (12:00 a.m.

June 10
18:00 UTC (1:00 p.m.

June 11
12:00 UTC (7:00 a.m.

June 13

12:00 UTC (7:00 a.m.
18:00 UTC (1:00 p.m.

June 15
00:00 UTC (7:00 p.m.
18:00 UTC (1:00 p.m.

June 16
18:00 UTC (1:00 p.m.

June 17
06:00 UTC (1:00 a.m.
09:00 UTC (4:00 a.m.
18:00 UTC (12:00 p.m.

July
July 8

00:00 UTC (5:00 p.m. PDT, July 7) at  – Tropical Depression Four-E forms about 1,025 mi (1,650 km) east-southeast of Hilo, Hawaii, quickly crossing west of 140°W and entering the Central Pacific basin.
12:00 UTC (2:00 a.m. HST) at  – Tropical Depression Four-E intensifies into Tropical Storm Ela about 885 mi (1,425 km) east-southeast of Hilo, Hawaii.
18:00 UTC (8:00 a.m.

July 10
00:00 UTC (2:00 p.m.
06:00 UTC (8:00 p.m. HST, July 9) at  – Tropical Depression One-C develops from an area of low pressure about 1,025 mi (1,650 km) southwest of Honolulu, Hawaii.
06:00 UTC (8:00 p.m. HST, July 9) at  – Tropical Depression Two-C develops from an area of low pressure about 750 mi (1,205 km) southeast of Honolulu, Hawaii.
12:00 UTC (2:00 a.m.

July 11
00:00 UTC (2:00 p.m. HST, July 10) at  – Tropical Depression One-C strengthens into Tropical Storm Halola about 1,200 mi (1,930 km) southwest of Honolulu, Hawaii.
12:00 UTC (7:00 a.m.
18:00 UTC (8:00 a.m.
18:00 UTC (1:00 p.m.

July 12

06:00 UTC (8:00 p.m.
12:00 UTC (5:00 a.m. PDT) at  – Tropical Depression Six-E develops from a broad low approximately 1,195 mi (1,920 km) west-southwest of Cabo San Lucas, Mexico.
18:00 UTC (8:00 a.m.

July 13
00:00 UTC (2:00 p.m. HST, July 12) – Tropical Storm Halola crosses the International Date Line (180°), entering the Western Pacific basin, and the Japan Meteorological Agency assumes monitoring responsibilities. Additional advisories are issued by the Joint Typhoon Warning Center and the National Weather Service office in Guam.
06:00 UTC (11:00 p.m. PDT) at  – Tropical Depression Six-E strengthens into Tropical Storm Enrique roughly 1,200 mi (1,930 km) southwest of Cabo San Lucas, Mexico.
12:00 UTC (6:00 a.m.

July 14
18:00 UTC (11:00 a.m.
July 15
00:00 UTC (6:00 p.m.
06:00 UTC (12:00 a.m.
12:00 UTC (6:00 a.m.

July 16

00:00 UTC (6:00 p.m.

July 17
00:00 UTC (6:00 p.m.
12:00 UTC (5:00 a.m.
12:00 UTC (5:00 a.m. PDT) at  – Tropical Storm Enrique weakens to a tropical depression roughly 1,190 mi (1,915 km) east-southeast of Hilo, Hawaii.

July 18
12:00 UTC (5:00 a.m. PDT) at  – Tropical Depression Enrique degenerates into a remnant low about 1,150 mi (1,850 km) east-southeast of Hilo, Hawaii.
18:00 UTC (11:00 a.m.

July 23
06:00 UTC (12:00 a.m.
12:00 UTC (6:00 a.m.

July 24
00:00 UTC (5:00 p.m.
18:00 UTC (11:00 a.m.

July 27
18:00 UTC (11:00 a.m. PDT) at  – Tropical Depression Eight-E develops from an area of low pressure about 1,115 mi (1,795 km) west-southwest of Cabo San Lucas, Mexico.

July 29
18:00 UTC (11:00 a.m. PDT) at  – Tropical Depression Nine-E develops from an area of low pressure about 1,440 mi (2,315 km) southwest of the southern tip of the Baja California Peninsula.

July 30
00:00 UTC (5:00 p.m. PDT, July 29) at  – Tropical Depression Nine-E intensifies into Tropical Storm Guillermo about 1,420 mi (2,285 km) southwest of Cabo San Lucas, Mexico.
00:00 UTC (5:00 p.m. PDT, July 30) at  – Tropical Depression Eight-E degenerates to a remnant area of low pressure about 1,225 mi (1,970 km) east of the Big Island of Hawaii.

July 31

06:00 UTC (11:00 p.m. PDT, July 30) at  – Tropical Storm Guillermo strengthens into a Category 1 hurricane about 1,770 mi (2,850 km) southeast of Hilo, Hawaii.
12:00 UTC (5:00 a.m. PDT) at  – Hurricane Guillermo attains Category 2 intensity about 1,625 mi (2,615 km) southeast of Hilo, Hawaii.
18:00 UTC (11:00 a.m.

August
August 2
00:00 UTC (2:00 p.m. HST, August 1) – Hurricane Guillermo crosses west of 140°W and enters the Central Pacific basin.
18:00 UTC (8:00 a.m. HST) at  – Hurricane Guillermo weakens to Category 1 intensity about 820 mi (1,320 km) southeast of Hilo, Hawaii.

August 3
12:00 UTC (2:00 a.m. HST) at  – Hurricane Guillermo weakens to a tropical storm approximately 655 mi (1,050 km) east-southeast of Hilo, Hawaii.

August 6
00:00 UTC (5:00 p.m. PDT, August 5) at  – Tropical Depression Ten-E develops from a tropical wave about 1,495 mi (2,405 km) west-southwest of Cabo San Lucas, Mexico.
12:00 UTC (5:00 a.m. PDT) at  – Tropical Depression Ten-E strengthens into Tropical Storm Hilda roughly 1,585 mi (2,550 km) west-southwest of Cabo San Lucas, Mexico.

August 7
00:00 UTC (2:00 p.m.
12:00 UTC (2:00 a.m.
18:00 UTC (11:00 a.m. PDT) at  – Tropical Storm Hilda strengthens to a Category 1 hurricane approximately 1,260 mi (2,025 km) east-southeast of Hilo, Hawaii.

August 8

00:00 UTC (5:00 p.m. PDT, August 6) at  – Hurricane Hilda rapidly intensifies to Category 3 strength about 1,170 mi (1,880 km) east-southeast of Hilo, Hawaii.
06:00 UTC (8:00 p.m. HST, August 6) – Hurricane Hilda crosses west of 140°W and enters the Central Pacific basin.
18:00 UTC (8:00 a.m. HST) at  – Hurricane Hilda strengthens to Category 4 intensity about 915 mi (1,475 km) east-southeast of Hilo, Hawaii.

August 9
12:00 UTC (2:00 a.m. HST) at  – Hurricane Hilda weakens to Category 3 status roughly 690 mi (1,110 km) east-southeast of Hilo, Hawaii.
18:00 UTC (8:00 a.m. HST) at  – Hurricane Hilda weakens to Category 2 intensity about 625 mi (1,010 km) southeast of Hilo, Hawaii.

August 10
18:00 UTC (8:00 a.m.

August 12
00:00 UTC (2:00 p.m.

August 13
18:00 UTC (8:00 a.m.

August 14
00:00 UTC (2:00 p.m.

August 16

00:00 UTC (6:00 p.m.

August 18
00:00 UTC (6:00 p.m. MDT, August 17) at   – Tropical Depression Eleven-E degenerates into a remnant low about 865 mi (1,390 km) west of Cabo San Lucas, Mexico.

August 21
00:00 UTC (2:00 p.m.
18:00 UTC (8:00 a.m.

August 22
06:00 UTC (8:00 p.m.
12:00 UTC (2:00 a.m.

August 23
00:00 UTC (2:00 p.m. HST, August 22) at  – Tropical Depression Loke restrengthens into a tropical storm roughly 635 mi (1,020 km) west of Johnston Island.

August 24
18:00 UTC (8:00 p.m.

August 25

00:00 UTC (5:00 p.m. PDT, August 24) at  – Tropical Depression Twelve-E forms from a tropical disturbance 1,450 mi (2,380 km) west-southwest of the southern tip of the Baja California Peninsula.
12:00 UTC (2:00 a.m.
18:00 UTC (8:00 a.m.
18:00 UTC (11:00 a.m. PDT) at  – Tropical Depression Twelve-E strengthens into Tropical Storm Ignacio approximately 1,655 mi (2,660 km) west-southwest of the southern tip of the Baja California Peninsula.

August 26
12:00 UTC (6:00 a.m. MDT) at  – Tropical Depression Thirteen-E forms from a large low-pressure area roughly 735 mi (1,185 km) southwest of Manzanillo, Mexico.
18:00 UTC (8:00 a.m.
18:00 UTC (8:00 p.m. Within the next six hours, Loke crosses the International Date Line and is absorbed by the extratropical cyclone that was formerly Typhoon Atsani.

August 27
00:00 UTC (5:00 p.m. PDT, August 26) at  – Tropical Storm Ignacio intensifies into a Category 1 hurricane around 1,925 mi (3,095 km) west-southwest of the southern tip of the Baja California Peninsula.
06:00 UTC (11:00 p.m. PDT, August 26) at  – Tropical Depression Thirteen-E develops into Tropical Storm Jimena about 895 mi (1,435 km) west-southwest of Manzanillo, Mexico.
18:00 UTC (8:00 a.m. HST) at  – Hurricane Ignacio enters the Central Pacific basin as a Category 1 hurricane about 1,095 mi (1,760 km) east-southeast of Hilo, Hawaii.

August 28
06:00 UTC (11:00 p.m. PDT, August 27) at  – Tropical Storm Jimena intensifies into a Category 1 hurricane approximately 1,175 mi (1,890 km) west-southwest of Manzanillo, Mexico.
18:00 UTC (11:00 a.m. PDT) at  – Hurricane Jimena rapidly intensifies into a Category 2 hurricane roughly 1,110 mi (1,785 km) southwest of the southern tip of the Baja California Peninsula.

August 29
00:00 UTC (5:00 p.m. PDT, August 28) at  – Hurricane Jimena explosively deepens into a Category 4 hurricane roughly 1,160 mi (1,865 km) southwest of the southern tip of the Baja California Peninsula.
06:00 UTC (8:00 p.m.
06:00 UTC (11:00 p.m.
12:00 UTC (2:00 a.m. HST) at  – Hurricane Ignacio rapidly strengthens to Category 3 status approximately 655 mi (1,050 km) east-southeast of Hilo, Hawaii.
18:00 UTC (8:00 a.m.
18:00 UTC (8:00 a.m.

August 30

00:00 UTC (2:00 p.m.
06:00 UTC (8:00 p.m.
18:00 UTC (8:00 a.m.
18:00 UTC (8:00 a.m.

August 31
12:00 UTC (8:00 a.m.
18:00 UTC (12:00 p.m. MDT) at  – Tropical Depression Fourteen-E develops from an elongated area of low pressure about 750 mi (1,205 km) south of Cabo San Lucas, Mexico.

September
September 1
06:00 UTC (8:00 p.m.
12:00 UTC (2:00 a.m. Within the next six hours, Kilo crosses the International Date Line as a Category 3 hurricane, becoming a Western Pacific typhoon.
12:00 UTC (5:00 a.m. PDT) at  – After spending 56 hours at Category 4 strength, Hurricane Jimena weakens to Category 3 status around 1,040 mi (1,670 km) east-southeast of Hilo, Hawaii. Shortly afterwards, Jimena crosses 140°W and enters the Central Pacific basin.
18:00 UTC (12:00 p.m. MDT) at  – Tropical Depression Fourteen-E strengthens into Tropical Storm Kevin approximately 725 mi (1,165 km) south-southwest of Cabo San Lucas, Mexico.

September 2
00:00 UTC (2:00 p.m.
12:00 UTC (2:00 a.m. HST) at  – Hurricane Jimena weakens to a Category 2 hurricane roughly 845 mi (1,355 km) east of Hilo, Hawaii.
18:00 UTC (8:00 a.m.

September 3

18:00 UTC (8:00 a.m.
18:00 UTC (11:00 a.m.

September 4
06:00 UTC (8:00 p.m. HST, September 3) at  – Hurricane Jimena drops to Category 1 status about 685 mi (1,100 km) east of Hilo, Hawaii.
September 5
00:00 UTC (2:00 p.m. HST, September 4) at  – Tropical Storm Ignacio degenerates into a post-tropical cyclone around 1,005 mi (1,620 km) north-northwest of Honolulu, Hawaii.
06:00 UTC (12:00 a.m.
12:00 UTC (6:00 a.m.
18:00 UTC (8:00 a.m.
18:00 UTC (12:00 p.m.

September 6
06:00 UTC (12:00 a.m.

September 7
06:00 UTC (12:00 a.m.
12:00 UTC (6:00 a.m.

September 8

12:00 UTC (6:00 a.m.

September 9
06:00 UTC (11:00 p.m.
12:00 UTC (2:00 a.m.
12:00 UTC (5:00 a.m.
18:00 UTC (11:00 a.m.

September 10
00:00 UTC (2:00 p.m.
12:00 UTC (5:00 a.m.

September 18
18:00 UTC (8:00 a.m. HST) at  – Tropical Depression Five-C develops roughly 1,210 mi (1,945 km) west-southwest of Honolulu, Hawaii.

September 20

18:00 UTC (12:00 p.m.

September 21
00:00 UTC (2:00 p.m.
04:45 UTC (10:45 p.m.
12:00 UTC (2:00 a.m.
13:45 UTC (7:45 a.m.
15:00 UTC (9:00 a.m.
18:00 UTC (12:00 p.m. MDT) – Tropical Depression Sixteen-E dissipates over Sonora, though its remnants continue moving northeastwards and later enter the Southwestern United States.

September 22
18:00 UTC (8:00 a.m.

September 25

00:00 UTC (2:00 p.m.
06:00 UTC (8:00 p.m.

September 26
18:00 UTC (8:00 a.m.
18:00 UTC (1:00 p.m.

September 27
00:00 UTC (7:00 p.m.

September 28
12:00 UTC (2:00 a.m.
12:00 UTC (7:00 a.m.
18:00 UTC (1:00 p.m.

September 29
00:00 UTC (2:00 p.m.
06:00 UTC (1:00 a.m.

September 30
06:00 UTC (1:00 a.m.

October
October 3
06:00 UTC (8:00 p.m. The twelfth tropical cyclone to form in or cross into the Central Pacific during 2015, this marks the highest number of systems in the basin during the satellite era.
06:00 UTC (8:00 p.m.
12:00 UTC (2:00 a.m.

October 4
06:00 UTC (8:00 p.m.

October 6

12:00 UTC (2:00 a.m.

October 7
06:00 UTC (8:00 p.m.
12:00 UTC (2:00 a.m.

October 8
00:00 UTC (2:00 p.m. HST, October 7) at  – Hurricane Oho weakens to Category 1 status about 885 mi (1,425 km) northeast of Hilo, Hawaii.
12:00 UTC (2:00 a.m. HST) at  – Hurricane Oho transitions into an extratropical cyclone, with winds falling below hurricane-force, roughly 1,220 mi (1,960 km) northeast of Hilo, Hawaii.

October 9
12:00 UTC (5:00 a.m. PDT) at  – Tropical Depression Eighteen-E develops from a broad area of low pressure about 1,680 mi (2,705 km) southeast of Hilo, Hawaii.

October 10
00:00 UTC (5:00 p.m. PDT, October 9) at  – Tropical Depression Eighteen-E strengthens into Tropical Storm Nora roughly 1,495 mi (2,405 km) southeast of Hilo, Hawaii.

October 11
06:00 UTC (8:00 p.m. HST, October 10) – Tropical Storm Nora crosses west of 140°W and enters the Central Pacific basin.

October 12
00:00 UTC (2:00 p.m.

October 14
06:00 UTC (8:00 p.m.

October 15

00:00 UTC (6:00 p.m. MDT, October 14) at  – Tropical Depression Nineteen-E forms from a broad area of low pressure around 990 mi (1,595 km) south-southwest of Cabo San Lucas, Mexico.
18:00 UTC (8:00 a.m.

October 17
00:00 UTC (5:00 p.m. PDT, October 16) at  – Tropical Depression Nineteen-E strengthens into Tropical Storm Olaf about 1,455 mi (2,340 km) southwest of the southern tip of the Baja California Peninsula.

October 18
06:00 UTC (11:00 p.m. PDT, October 17) at  – Tropical Storm Olaf intensifies into a Category 1 hurricane roughly 1,715 mi (2,760 km) west-southwest of the southern tip of the Baja California Peninsula, becoming the lowest-latitude hurricane on record in the Eastern Pacific.

October 19
00:00 UTC (5:00 p.m. PDT, October 18) at  – Hurricane Olaf intensifies into a Category 2 hurricane about 1,895 mi (3,050 km) west-southwest of the southern tip of the Baja California Peninsula.
12:00 UTC (5:00 a.m. PDT) at  – Hurricane Olaf rapidly strengthens into a Category 3 hurricane approximately 2,015 mi (3,245 km) west-southwest of the southern tip of the Baja California Peninsula. This gives Olaf the further distinction of being the lowest-latitude major hurricane on record in the Eastern Pacific.
18:00 UTC (11:00 a.m. PDT) at  – Hurricane Olaf rapidly strengthens into a Category 4 hurricane around 2,070 mi (3,335 km) west-southwest of the southern tip of the Baja California Peninsula.

October 20
06:00 UTC (8:00 p.m.
06:00 UTC (1:00 a.m.

October 21
00:00 UTC (7:00 p.m.
12:00 UTC (2:00 a.m. HST) at  – Hurricane Olaf weakens to Category 3 status around 920 mi (1,480 km) southeast of Hilo, Hawaii.

October 22
06:00 UTC (1:00 a.m.
12:00 UTC (7:00 a.m.
18:00 UTC (8:00 a.m. HST) at  – Hurricane Olaf briefly weakens to Category 2 status approximately 725 mi (1,165 km) southeast of Hilo, Hawaii.
18:00 UTC (1:00 p.m.

October 23

00:00 UTC (2:00 p.m. HST, October 22) at  – Hurricane Olaf reattains Category 3 strength about 700 mi (1,130 km) southeast of Hilo, Hawaii.
00:00 UTC (7:00 p.m.
12:00 UTC (7:00 a.m. This ranks Patricia as the strongest tropical cyclone ever observed in the Western Hemisphere, surpassing Atlantic Hurricane Wilma in 2005 which attained a pressure of 882 mbar (hPa). It is also the second-most intense tropical cyclone on record worldwide, just shy of Typhoon Tip in 1979 which attained a pressure of 870 mbar (hPa).
23:00 UTC (6:00 p.m. This makes it the strongest landfalling storm on record in the Eastern Pacific.

October 24
00:00 UTC (7:00 p.m.
03:00 UTC (10:00 p.m.
12:00 UTC (7:00 a.m.
Before 18:00 UTC (1:00 p.m. CDT) – Tropical Depression Patricia dissipates over central Mexico.
18:00 UTC (8:00 a.m. HST) at  – Hurricane Olaf weakens back to Category 2 status approximately 650 mi (1,045 km) east of Hilo, Hawaii.

October 25
06:00 UTC (8:00 p.m. HST, October 24) at  – Hurricane Olaf weakens further to Category 1 strength approximately 710 mi (1,140 km) east of Hilo, Hawaii.

October 26
12:00 UTC (2:00 a.m. HST) at  – Hurricane Olaf weakens into a tropical storm approximately 1,580 mi (2,545 km) west-southwest of San Diego, California.
18:00 UTC (8:00 a.m. HST) at  – Tropical Storm Olaf crosses 140°W from the west and reenters the Eastern Pacific basin roughly 1,440 mi (2,320 km) west-southwest of San Diego, California. This makes Olaf the first tropical cyclone to cross from the Eastern Pacific into the Central Pacific and back into the Eastern Pacific on record.

October 27
12:00 UTC (2:00 a.m. HST) at  – Tropical Storm Olaf degenerates into a post-tropical cyclone about 1,180 mi (1,900 km) west-southwest of San Diego, California.

November
November 18
12:00 UTC (5:00 a.m.

November 19
12:00 UTC (5:00 a.m.

November 22
06:00 UTC (10:00 p.m. PST, November 21) at  – Tropical Storm Rick weakens to a tropical depression roughly 640 mi (1,030 km) southwest of Cabo San Lucas, Mexico.
18:00 UTC (10:00 a.m. PST) at  – Tropical Depression Rick degenerates to a remnant low about 675 mi (1,085 km) west-southwest of Cabo San Lucas, Mexico.

November 23

18:00 UTC (12:00 p.m.

November 24
00:00 UTC (6:00 p.m.

November 25
06:00 UTC (11:00 p.m.
12:00 UTC (5:00 a.m.

November 26
00:00 UTC (5:00 p.m.
06:00 UTC (11:00 p.m.

November 27
00:00 UTC (5:00 p.m.
06:00 UTC (11:00 p.m.
18:00 UTC (11:00 a.m.

November 28
00:00 UTC (5:00 p.m.
06:00 UTC (11:00 p.m.

November 30
The 2015 Pacific hurricane season officially ends.

December
December 31
00:00 UTC (2:00 p.m. HST, December 30) at  – Tropical Depression Nine-C develops about 1,080 mi (1,740 km) south-southwest of Johnston Island.

January 2016
January 1
00:00 UTC (2:00 p.m. HST, December 31) at  – Tropical Depression Nine-C weakens to a remnant low about 1,105 mi (1,780 km) south-southwest of Johnston Island.

See also

Timeline of the 2015 Atlantic hurricane season
Timeline of the 2015 Pacific typhoon season

Notes

References

External links

 The National Hurricane Center's 2015 Tropical Cyclone Advisory Archive
 The National Hurricane Center's Tropical Cyclone Reports for the 2015 Eastern Pacific hurricane season
 The Central Pacific Hurricane Center's Tropical Cyclone Reports for the 2015 Central Pacific hurricane season

2015 Pacific hurricane season
Pacific hurricane meteorological timelines
Articles which contain graphical timelines
2015 EPac T